Talha Sarıarslan (born 18 January 2004) is a Turkish professional footballer who plays as a forward for Süper Lig club Kayserispor.

Career
Sarıarslan is a youth product of Kayserispor, and started training with the senior team after a prolific stint with their U19s. On 14 March 2022, he signed his first professional contract with Kayserispor. He made his professional debut with them as a late substitute in a 5–0 Turkish Cup win over Yomraspor on 4 November 2020.

International career
Sarıarslan is a youth international for Turkey, having played up to the Turkey U18s.

References

External links
 
 

2004 births
Living people
People from Kocasinan
Turkish footballers
Turkey youth international footballers
Association football forwards
Süper Lig players
Kayserispor footballers